The Oyster River is a tributary of the Saint George River in Knox County, Maine. Its lower third forms the border between Warren and Thomaston.

See also 
 East Branch Oyster River
 West Branch Oyster River
 List of rivers of Maine

References 

 Maine Streamflow Data from the USGS
 Maine Watershed Data From Environmental Protection Agency

Rivers of Knox County, Maine
Rivers of Maine